"Or Nah" is a song by American singer Ty Dolla $ign, featuring American rapper Wiz Khalifa and American record producer DJ Mustard, who co-produced the song with Mike Free. The song was released on January 7, 2014, as the second single from Ty Dolla $ign's debut EP, Beach House EP (2014). The song has since peaked at number 48 on the US Billboard Hot 100 chart. The official remix features Canadian singer the Weeknd and was released on June 10, 2014. On April 29, 2014, it officially impacted rhythmic contemporary radio in the United States. The song samples the signature "bed squeaking" from the 2004 hit single "Some Cut".

Critical reception
Upon its release, "Or Nah" was met with generally positive reviews from music critics. Complex described it as "slang expander that's sure to alter your day-to-day work conversations". About the song XXL magazine wrote, "The Taylor Gang affiliate enlists Wiz Khalifa to come through on the DJ Mustard-produced “Oh Nah”—a collaborative cut void of romance and love, but rather focuses on getting straight to the point—or in this case, the sheets. While DJ Mustard subtlety guides the track with the sounds of creaking bedsprings, both Ty Dolla $ign and Wiz take the time to question their potential bedmates about food and weed, making sure the femme fatale can cater to their needs."

Music video
A music video for the remix, directed by Ryan Patrick, was shot in January 2014 and released on June 13, 2014.

Critical reception
Rap-Up described the music video as "dark and mysterious", also noting that it features "a bevy of sexy ladies". The Fader wrote that, "the darkly seductive clip remains placid and uneventful throughout, a late plot twist leaves us wondering if Ty's pussy-hunting will meet a crazed fate". Stereogum compared the video to a Swedish thriller, "which features a horror-movie plot twist at the end".

Charts

Weekly charts

Year-end charts

Certifications

References

2013 songs
2014 singles
Ty Dolla Sign songs
Wiz Khalifa songs
Mustard (record producer) songs
Atlantic Records singles
Song recordings produced by Mustard (record producer)
Songs written by Mustard (record producer)
Songs written by Wiz Khalifa
Songs written by Ty Dolla Sign